The University of Management and Technology (UMT) is a private research university located in Lahore, Pakistan. It is chartered by the Government of Punjab and is recognized by the Higher Education Commission of Pakistan (HEC) in the W4 category, the highest attainable HEC ranking for Pakistani universities.

Its institutional memberships include the Asia Pacific Quality Network (APQN), Asian Science Park Association (ASPA), ACBSP Global Business Accreditation, The Chemical Society of Pakistan, South Asia Triple Helix Association, AACSB Business Education Connected, AMDISA, FUIW, Global Business School Network, International Association of Universities, American Mathematical Society, Pakistan Mathematical Society, PILA, South African Mathematical Society and EFMD Global Network.

Ranking 
UMT has been ranked the number 1 private sector university in Pakistan by Times Higher Education in its World University Rankings 2023 released in October 2022. THE also placed the university among the best 501-600 universities in the world. UMT received a score of 99.9 for research citations, making it the university with the best citation score in Pakistan. 

The varsity has been placed among the top 301-400 universities in the world for Engineering and Technology, Physical Sciences, Computer Sciences, and Social Sciences education, while it was among the world's 401-500 best universities for Business and Economics education.             

Previously, UMT was named among the top 600 higher education institutes of the world for societal impact in the THE impact rankings 2020. UMT was also named among the top 500 in QS Asia University Rankings 2021, besides being nominated for the Times Higher Education Award Asia 2020 in the Workplace of the year category.

Accreditations 
UMT holds 9 accreditations, including the National Business Education Accreditation Council, National Computing Education Accreditation Council, Pakistan Council for Architects and Town Planners, Pakistan Engineering Council, Pakistan Bar Council, National Agriculture Education Accreditation Council, Society of Human Resource Management (SHRM), Association of Management Development Institutions in South Asia (AMDISA) and Association to Advance Collegiate Schools of Business (AACSB).

History 
UMT is a project of the Institute of Leadership and Management (ILM) Trust, established in 1990. ILM became an independent degree-awarding institution following the grant of charter in 2002 through an Act of the Provincial Assembly of the Punjab, the largest provincial legislature of Pakistan. After the award of charter, it was first named Institute of Management and Technology, however, on June 16, 2004, IMT was renamed the University of Management and Technology through the passing of a similar Act by the Punjab Assembly.

Academics 
The university offers more than 150+ bachelor's, master's, and doctoral degree programs in a diverse range of fields such as management, technology, textile design, banking, computer science, economics, education, engineering, aviation, liberal arts, information technology, artificial intelligence, media and communication, languages and mental and physical health sciences.

Schools and institutes 

The academic programs at UMT are carried out by 16 schools and three institutes that collectively contribute towards serving the country's rising demand for quality higher education.

Schools

Institutes 
 Institute of Aviation Studies
 Institute of Islamic Perspectives and  Guidance
 Institute of Liberal Arts

University campuses 

Covering an area of more than 200 kanals (25 acres), the UMT main campus is located in Lahore's Johar Town. Almost all public transport ply the routes adjacent to the university. The main campus comprises:

 Main Academic Block (commonly referred to as the main building) 
 The Library Building, 
 The SEN Building 
 The SDT Building 
 The Administration Building
 UMT Grand Mosque

The campus has a purpose-built library called the Learning Resource Centre, classrooms, science and engineering laboratories, facilities for indoor/outdoor sports, cafeteria, and Symposium Café (SDT Building and Library Building - Opposite Boys Gate). The UMT mosque offers provisions for daily prayers, as well as Friday sermons by scholars and speakers.

UMT has two other campuses in Lahore - the Quaid-e-Azam Campus that houses the School of Commerce and Accountancy and the Raiwind Campus that houses the School of Health Sciences and the School of Pharmacy.

A sub-campus of the university is located in Sialkot. UMT is the first private sector university to establish an HEC approved sub-campus in Sialkot, a city known for the manufacturing and export of items such as surgical and musical instruments, sports goods, leather goods, and textile goods.

The sub-campus was formally inaugurated in Sialkot on May 2, 2012. The campus is spread over 20 kanals of land and is situated in Small Industrial Estate road which is the central part of Sialkot city. For extracurricular activities, a dedicated 56 kanals of land has been acquired near Daska.

Clubs and societies 
UMT has more than 60 active clubs and societies that help fuel the students' desire to engage in cocurricular and extracurricular activities. These outlets provide countless opportunities to students to develop crucial career and communication skills like team-building, teamwork, problem solving, social work and philanthropy etc. and help students develop rounded personalities.

Sports at UMT 

Sports are an integral part of life at UMT as the varsity believes that avenues for physical exertion are as vital for students' development as are opportunities for mental strengthening.

The UMT Greens lies in the middle of the university premises and is home to many of the sports students engage in daily. It has provision for sports like cricket, football, field hockey and athletics. Other sports like badminton, volleyball, netball and table tennis also enjoy immense popularity at UMT.

Gym And CrossFit center   
UMT is also home to a highly well-equipped gym and a CrossFit Centre that enjoy great popularity among the staff and students alike. The gym has state-of-the art machinery like treadmills, elliptical trainers and ergometers as well as a dedicated trainer who helps gym-goers make the best use of their time. UMT has also set up a CrossFit center with grueling circuits and equipment to help students engage in healthy physical activities.

Learning centers 

UMT has centers that aid the varsity's and students' desire for knowledge creation, business and technological innovations, thought leadership and community engagement. These include:
Center for Knowledge Future
 Center for Supply Chain Research
 Center for Globally Responsible Leaders
 Center for Entrepreneurship and Innovation
 Center for Mathematics and its Applications
 Center for Advancement of Systems and Technology
 Center for Teaching and Learning
 Center for Enterprise and Technology Advancement
 Center for Industrial Services and Research
 Center for Sustainable Development
 Center for Languages
 Center for Multidisciplinary Research
 Housing Research Center
 Institute of Trade and competitiveness

International linkages 
UMT has links with over 60 international universities and institutes.

Journals and publications 
 Journal of Islamic Thought and Civilization (JITC)
 Islamic Banking and Finance Review (IBFR)
 Linguistics and Literature Review (LLR)
 Journal of Management and Research (JMR)
 Scientific Inquiry and Review (SIR)
 Journal of Art, Architecture and Built Environment (JAABE)
 Organization Theory Review (OTR)
 BioScientific Review (BSR)
 UMT Education Review (UER)
 Clinical and Counseling Psychology Review (CCPR)
 Journal of Communication and Cultural Trends (JCCT)
 Journal of Quantitative Methods (JQM)
 Journal of Finance and Accounting Research (JFAR)
 Empirical Economic Review (EER)

Around 30+ books have been published by UMT faculty members.

Scholarships and financial assistance 
 5+ billion rupees worth of financial aid has been granted to deserving students since the university's inception.
 Merit scholarships are granted to the participants seeking admission in bachelor's degree programs at the time of admission on submission of proof of marks/grades obtained in the Intermediate/A-Level examination.
 Siblings of alumni and current students receive tuition fee waivers depending upon the number of siblings who have studied or are currently enrolled in any degree program.
 A range of scholarships are available, including Dr Hasan Sohaib Murad PhD Fellowship Program, Outstanding Sportsmen and Extracurricular Scholarship, Differently-Abled Scholarship, and Remote Area Scholarships just to name a few.
 The university offers discounts for students of ILM Colleges.

Hostels and accommodation 
The university boys' hostel is situated in Mustafa Town, Lahore along the main Wahdat Road, while the girls' hostel is located in Wapda Town. Both towns are among the most accessible and safest localities of the metropolis. The residential facilities made available ensure that occupants have access to a peaceful and hygienic environment that aids the pursuit of education.

Notable alumni 
 Misbah-ul-Haq (Former cricketer, head coach Pakistan National Cricket Team)
 Sara Naveed (Author)

References 

Universities and colleges in Lahore
Private universities and colleges in Punjab, Pakistan
Educational institutions established in 2002
2002 establishments in Pakistan